Spencer Creek is a  long 2nd order tributary to the Uwharrie River, in Montgomery County, North Carolina, United States.

Course
Spencer Creek rises on the Dumas Creek divide about 4 miles northwest of Lovejoy in Montgomery County, North Carolina. Spencer Creek then flows southwest and curves northwest to meet the Uwharrie River about 1 mile north of Uwharrie.

Watershed
Spencer Creek drains  of area, receives about 47.8 in/year of precipitation, has a topographic wetness index of 347.87 and is about 88% forested.

See also
List of rivers of North Carolina

References

Rivers of North Carolina
Rivers of Montgomery County, North Carolina